53rd General Assembly of Nova Scotia represented Nova Scotia between October 6, 1981, and November 6, 1984, its membership being set in the 1981 Nova Scotia general election. John M. Buchanan led the Progressive Conservatives to a Majority Government.

Division of seats

The division of seats within the Nova Scotia Legislature after the General Election of 1981

List of members

† denotes the speaker

Former members of the 53rd General Assembly



References 

Terms of the General Assembly of Nova Scotia
1981 establishments in Nova Scotia
1984 disestablishments in Nova Scotia
20th century in Nova Scotia